Gremyashchiy (lit. "thunderous"; alternate spellings Gremyashchy, Gremyaschi, and Gremyashchi) can refer to a number of Soviet warships:

 , a Soviet Navy  and one of the most famous Soviet destroyers of World War II
  (ru), a Soviet Navy 
  (ru), a Soviet Navy 
  (ru), a Soviet Navy Sovremennyy-class destroyer

See also
  - ships of other Russian navies

Soviet Navy ship names